Bian Paul Šauperl (born 15 April 1995) is a Slovenian footballer who plays as a forward for SC Kalsdorf.

Honours
Maribor
Slovenian Championship: 2012–13
Slovenian Cup: 2012–13
Slovenian Supercup: 2012, 2013

SC Kalsdorf
Steirischer Fußballcup: 2018–19

Notes

References

External links
NZS profile 

1995 births
Living people
Slovenian footballers
Association football forwards
NK Maribor players
NK Celje players
Slovenian PrvaLiga players
Slovenian Second League players
Slovenia youth international footballers
Slovenian expatriate footballers
Slovenian expatriate sportspeople in Austria
Expatriate footballers in Austria